Hollis is an unincorporated community in Cloud County, Kansas, United States.

History

The community was originally named Christie, for W. J. Christie, the original owner of the town site.

Hollis was a shipping point located at the junction of the Chicago, Burlington and Quincy and the Union Pacific Railroads.

A tornado hit Hollis on May 14, 1909, at five o'clock in the evening causing serious damage and killing several people.  The town was "swept away" by the tornado Only three buildings in the town were reported to have escaped damage, and total damage estimates were over $50,000 in 1909 dollars. In 1910, the community reported a population of just 50 people.

Education
The community is served by Concordia USD 333 public school district.

References

Further reading

External links
 Cloud County maps: Current, Historic, KDOT

Unincorporated communities in Cloud County, Kansas
Unincorporated communities in Kansas